Hardin Kimbrough "Kemp" Toney (March 2, 1876 – March 9, 1955) was a Democratic politician from Jefferson County, Arkansas. He represented the county in the Arkansas Senate from 1905 to 1913, and the Arkansas House of Representatives from 1931 to 1949.

He served as President of the Senate of the 38th Arkansas General Assembly, and as Speaker of the House of the 49th Arkansas General Assembly.

Early life
Toney was born to William Lunsford Toney and Martha Clarinda ( Kimbrough) near Oxford, Mississippi in 1875. He attended the University of Mississippi. He served as the first president of the Pine Bluff Rotary Club.

See also
 Jeff Davis (Arkansas governor) - Governor of Arkansas while Toney entered politics

References

 

1955 deaths
1870s births
People from Oxford, Mississippi
Politicians from Jefferson County, Arkansas
Speakers of the Arkansas House of Representatives
Democratic Party members of the Arkansas House of Representatives